The Russian First Division 1999 was the eighth edition of the Russian First Division.

Overview

Standings

Top goalscorers 

23 goals
Konstantin Paramonov (Amkar)

20 goals
 Mikheil Jishkariani (Sokol)

18 goals
 Andradina (Arsenal)

16 goals
Andrei Fedkov (Baltika)

14 goals
Andrei Bakalets (Torpedo-Viktoriya)
Vadim Belokhonov (Metallurg Krasnoyarsk)
Sergei Bulatov (Fakel)
 Vaso Sepashvili (Spartak)

13 goals
Nail Galimov (Lokomotiv Chita)
Andrei Knyazev (Rubin / Torpedo-ZIL)

See also
Russian Top Division 1999
Russian Second Division 1999

External links
1999 Russian First Division by Footballfacts

2
Russian First League seasons
Russia
Russia